Francisco Bartolucci Johnston (born 24 December 1949) is a Chilean politician who was deputy.

He taught at the Pontifical Catholic University of Valparaíso Law School.

References

External links
 BCN Profile

Living people
20th-century Chilean lawyers
Pontifical Catholic University of Valparaíso alumni
Academic staff of the Pontifical Catholic University of Valparaíso
National Party (Chile, 1966) politicians
Independent Democratic Union politicians
20th-century Chilean politicians
21st-century Chilean politicians
Chilean anti-communists
1949 births